Johan Caspar Krogh (1776–1831) was a Norwegian government official and politician.  He served as the County Governor of Finnmark county from 1814 until 1828. He was also elected to the Parliament of Norway in 1824, serving until 1826 when his health began to decline.

References

1776 births
1831 deaths
County governors of Norway
Members of the Storting